Hüsnü Çakırgil (born 3 October 1965 in Turkey) is a former Turkish professional basketball player. He was well-known for his great 3 point shooting ability. At a height of 1.98 m (6'6") tall, he played at the small forward position.

Professional career
Çakırgil was the  Top Scorer of the Turkish Super League, in 1989.

National team career
Çakırgil was a member of the senior Turkish national basketball team. With Turkey, he played at the 1993 EuroBasket.

References

External links
FIBA Profile
FIBA Europe Profile
TBLStat.net Profile

1965 births
Living people
Beşiktaş men's basketball players
Fenerbahçe men's basketball players
Small forwards
Turkish men's basketball players